The CVS/pharmacy LPGA Challenges was a 72-hole golf tournament for professional female golfers that was part of the LPGA Tour from 1996 through 2010. It was played at various sites in Northern California and was managed by the Bruno Event Team. In 2006 the tournament moved to its last location at the Blackhawk Country Club in Danville.

In 1996 the tournament was known as the Twelve Bridges LPGA Classic.  Between 1997 and 2008 the title sponsor was Longs Drugs, a drugstore chain headquartered in Walnut Creek and the tournament was known as the Longs Drugs Challenge.  In October 2008, CVS/pharmacy completed its purchase of the Longs chain and took over the sponsorship of the tournament, renamed the CVS/pharmacy LPGA Challenge for 2009. CVS sponsored the tournament for two years before dropping its support; the final year was 2010.

Tournament names through the years:
1996: Twelve Bridges LPGA Classic
1997–2008: Longs Drugs Challenge
2009–2010: CVS/pharmacy LPGA Challenge

Winners

1 Shortened to 54 holes due to rain.

Tournament record

External links

LPGA official microsite

Former LPGA Tour events
Golf in California
Recurring sporting events established in 1996
Recurring sporting events disestablished in 2010
1996 establishments in California
2010 disestablishments in California
Women's sports in California